Pope Benedict XI (r. 1303–04) created 2 cardinals in 2 consistories held during his pontificate. Both cardinals he appointed were Dominicans like the pope himself.

18 December 1303
Benedict XI also intended to name the English Dominican priest William of Macclesfield as the Cardinal-Priest of Santa Sabina on this date but the cardinal-elect died before news of his elevation could reach him.
 Niccolò Alberti O.P. (Cardinal-Bishop of Ostia e Velletri)

19 February 1304
 Walter Winterburn O.P. (Cardinal-Priest of Santa Sabina)

Notes and references

Sources

College of Cardinals
Benedict XI

 Ben